Bythinella viridis  is a species of very small freshwater snail, an aquatic gastropod mollusc in the family Amnicolidae. This species is found in Belgium and France.

References

Bythinella
Gastropods described in 1801
Fauna of Belgium
Taxonomy articles created by Polbot